Alfanso "Al" Hedman (born 22 November 1953 from Jamaica) is a former Jamaican–born English professional darts player, who played in Professional Darts Corporation events.

Career
Hedman won the 1995 BDO British Open, defeating Andy Fordham of England.

He qualified for the 1995 BDO European Darts Masters, but lost at the Last 24 stage to Bob Taylor of Scotland.

Hedman lost to Paul Whitworth of England in the 1996 BDO Gold Cup.

Hedman qualified for the 2003 PDC World Darts Championship, but lost at the Last-40 stage to Bob Anderson of England.

He played in three stages of the UK Open, but losing at the Last-64 stage to Shayne Burgess of England.

Hedman left the PDC in 2005.

World Championship performances results

PDC
 2003: Last 40: (lost to Bob Anderson 0–4) (sets)

Personal life
Hedman has two children, James and Laura, and has been married to Lesley since 2002. His sister is Deta Hedman.

References

External links

1953 births
Living people
Jamaican darts players
English darts players
Professional Darts Corporation associate players
Sportspeople from Kingston, Jamaica